Rudy Aernoudt is a Belgian professor, writer, politician, economist and philosopher, born in Torhout. He was many times Chief of staff (director of cabinet) of the Ministers of economy and innovation both in Flanders and in Wallonia, of the Belgian Minister of economics and scientific policy and of the President of the European Economic and Social Committee, Henri Malosse. He is the only person to serve as Head of Cabinet at the European, Belgian, Walloon and Flemish levels.
He is professor of corporate finance at the Universities of Ghent and Nancy and Professor of Economics, Monetary and Geopolitical Environment for the International Executive MBA delivered by UCLouvain – BMI Executive Institute.

Professional career 
Holding master's degree in monetary and industrial economics from KU Leuven, European economics from the College of Europe and Thomistic philosophy from KU Leuven, Rudy Aernoudt began his career as credit manager in the international banking sector before becoming an official in the European Commission. He was mainly responsible for programs for access to finance. He has written several books and articles on enterprise finance, on politics, on philosophy and in particular on corruption, its nature, its consequences and how to tackle and prevent it. He even published a by the press well received novel (De Duivelszak) about it.

He writes, following this experience and due to his convictions, the book which will make him known to the general public "Wallonia - Flanders, I love you, me neither" published in 2006. In it, he seeks to dispel the different Flemish clichés on Wallonia and to demonstrate the relevance of the unity of Belgium. This book – a real bestseller – is also a response to the Warande manifesto, a publication by a group of Flemish businessmen and academics, aiming to demonstrate the relevance of Flemish independence from an economic point of view. The same year as he became Secretary-General of the Flemish administration, following his departure from office and his appointment, he denounced embezzlement within his own cabinet with the Minister Fientje Moerman, who was forced to resign.
Rudy Aernoudt followed up on this momentum by publishing the following year "Brussels, the unloved child" which insists on the advantages that Brussels offers to Belgium, deemed underexploited.

2007 witnessed the EU crisis and the electoral victory of the cartel CD&V/NVA whose visions of the future of the country radically opposed to those of Rudy Aernoudt. He was thus abruptly let go following an interview published in Le Soir where he questioned the legitimacy of Yves Leterme to lead a reform of the state at the expense of the federal government. The Flemish Government stated that "any collaboration had become impossible". Rudy Aernoudt presented his version of events in "Adventures of a 'cabinettard" and, after losing the first trial, gets the conviction of the Flemish government.

 Academic career 

Since 2022, he is affiliate professor at the BMI executive MBA, in partnership with LMS-Leuven and HEC Paris, ranked 17th executive MBA in the world. From 2007 to 2010, he was also a lecturer at the University of Liège of a course in Dutch entitled "Introduction to good governance" (Inleiding tot goed bestuur), whose neutrality was questioned by the Belgian Movement of Young Socialists. He was a guest professor at the Technical University of Brno at the Czech Republic.

He was director-general of OLPC, a spin-off of the Massachusetts Institute of Technology (MIT). Based on this experience, he became curator of TEDxBrussels (www.TEDxbrussels.eu). Now he is a regular speaker at TEDx events on topics as the (non)sense of economy   Besides, he speaks at numerous conferences (ESA, OECD, Dubai Forum, CEO summit, etc).

"Rudy Aernoudt is a brilliant Flemish liberal intellectual. Through several books, Rudy Aernoudt is one of the very rare Flemish personalities to promote the union of Belgium, supported by figures [...] Whether you agree or disagree with his ideas, Rudy Aernoudt appears as an intelligent man, offering creative ideas and supporting his conclusions with advanced technical analysis. Far from being an ordinary speaker, he is an excellent speaker with explosive humour." 

 European civil service 

He co-founded EBAN, the European Business angel network. He is senator ambassador and European chair of the World Business Angels Investment Forum. In April 2013, he became the Head of Cabinet of the President of the European Economic and Social Committee, the Frenchman Henri Malosse. He thus became the only Belgian to have served as Head of Cabinet at the European, national (Belgian) and regional (Wallonia and Flanders) levels. He conceived and launched an SBIC-inspired investment initiative at the Commission called ESCALAR, that supports venture capital and growth financing for promising companies, enabling them to scale up in Europe and help reinforce Europe's economic and technological sovereignty, which he explained for instance at Euronews.  The Wall Street Journal identified him as "the hero for European entrepreneurship", and he is considered as the father of the business angels in Europe.

 Political mood 

Rudy Aernoudt continued his political battle in 2008 by creating a bilingual movement, "België Anders/La Belgique Autrement" (Belgium differently), which organized a series of conferences. He teaches in different universities (Ghent, Brussels) and became director-general of OLPC, a spin-off from MIT.

In 2008, he created the LiDE party, which he left in 2009, to become, in November 2009, Co-Chair of the Popular Party, another political party that has enjoyed rapid success but was a victim of internal tensions. He wanted to make an alliance with the MR but the FDF vetoed by threatening to leave the MR. Aernoudt is considered to be the architect of this separation. In 2009, he became co-chairman of the new People's Party. He was expelled from the party in late August 2010, after what appears to be an internal power struggle, an exclusion whose regularity he often denies while denouncing what he sees as a drift of the party. Modrikamen in turn was excluded in September 2010 by Aernoudt and co-disciples. Aernoudt was confirmed with an overwhelming majority of 28,000 votes but left active politics; at least in terms of political parties.

For his political positions, Rudy Aernoudt has received several awards''', among which the prestigious award of the French community Aron - Condorcet, the price for best European entrepreneurship program, the prize for political courage at Belgian level B+  and WBAIF-award for advancing the agenda for World Business Angels. He is a special advisor at the Diplomatic Institute; honorary council member of the Horta-Freson Foundation  and gender ambassador.

 Publications 

"Europa, een blik achter de schermen, Intersentia, 2022" 
"L'Europe, vue de l'intérieur, vers un nouvel élan?, Mardaga, 2022"
"Entrepreneurship, no guts, no Glory, Intersentia Cambridge, 2020"
"Coronavirus: electroshock for Belgium, Van Gompel @ Scavina, 2020"
"Coronavirus: electrochoc pour la Belgique? Mardaga, 2020" 
"Financieel Management, Toegepast; Intersentia, 2019"
"Financial Management Applied, Intersentia,2019 
 "Entrepreneurship, A way of life, Intersentia, 2015 
 "Wake-Ups Belgians", Roularta Books, 2012 
 De Duivelszak, Roularta Books, 2012, .
 Leven zonder job - Van jobtaker naar jobmaker, Roularta Books, 2011, 211p, .
 La politique, ça trompe énormément - Descente aux enfers politiques, Roularta Books, 2008, 270 p, .
 Peripeties d'un Cabinettard - l'Abus de Pouvoir, Roularta Books, 2008, 191 p, .
 Comment l'état gaspille votre argent : Mauvaise gestion, clientélisme ... en finir, Roularta Books, 2008, .
 Bruxelles : l’enfant mal aimé, Roularta Books/VIF éd, 2007, 180 p, .
 Wallonie - Flandre, Je t'aime moi non plus, Roularta Books, 2006, 250 p, .
 Arbeid, Lust of Last ?, Roularta Business Books, 2005, 121 p, .
 Bazel II, Hoe er voordeel uit halen ?, Intersentia, 2005, 145 p, .
 L'éloge du (non) travail, L'Harmattan, 2005, 130 p, .
 Ondernemingsfinanciering, over bankkredieten, business angels en risicokapitaal, Roularta Business Books 2004, 328 p, .
 Corporate Finance Yearbook 2004, Chief Editor, Intersentia, Antwerp-Oxford-New York 2003, 250 p, .
 Corruption à foison, L'Harmattan, Paris, 2003, 150 p, .
 European Enterprise policy, From SME policy to entrepreneurship policy, Intersentia, Antwerp-Oxford-New York, 2003, .
 The taste of entrepreneurship: Financing and Research, proceedings of the European conference, Chief Editor, Roularta books, 2003, 110 p. (fr)(en), .
 Business Angels, Rare vogels of ware engelen ?, avec H. Goossens, Roularta Business Books, 2002, 145 p, .
 Corporate Finance Yearbook, Chief Editor, Intersentia, Antwerp-Oxford-New York 2002, 250 p, .
 La Paresse économique, pour en finir avec la troisième voie, Vif-L'express, 2002, 95 p, .
 Verdien Risicokapitaal, avec E. Lacroix, B. Huybrechts, et al., Intersentia, 2002, 144 p, .
 Duurzaam ondernemen in de Europese Context, Garant Éditions, 2001, 230 p, .
 Financing SMEs, the European Approach, proceedings of the European Conference, Chief Editor, Roularta Books, 2001, 222 p. (fr)(en), .
 Bedrijfsfinanciering, een benadering vanuit de praktijk, Roularta business books, 2000, 220 p, .
 Waarom corruptie welig tiert ?, Roularta Business Books, 2000, 145 p, .
 Waarom het Konijn eruitziet als een eend ? pleidooi voor een nieuw sociaal én economisch model, Roularta Business books, 1998, 110p, .
 La Politique Structurelle en Europe'', avec Richard Skrzypczak, collection Réflexe Europe, documentation française, 1998, 230 p, .

References

External links 
 Home

People from Torhout
Belgian politicians
Belgian economists
Belgian non-fiction writers
Belgian male writers
1960 births
Living people
Male non-fiction writers